Heli Jukkola (born 26 November 1979, in Noormarkku) is a Finnish orienteering competitor.  She won the 2007 Long distance World Orienteering Championships, and finished second in 2005.   In the Middle distance, she finished second in 2007, and third 2003 and 2004. Two times Relay World Champion, from 2006 and 2007, as member of the Finnish winning team, and also silver medal from 2004.

See also
 Finnish orienteers
 List of orienteers
 List of orienteering events

References

External links
 
 

1979 births
Living people
People from Noormarkku
Finnish orienteers
Female orienteers
Foot orienteers
World Orienteering Championships medalists
Sportspeople from Satakunta
Junior World Orienteering Championships medalists